Boasting is speaking with excessive pride.

Boast may also refer to:

 Robin Boast (born 1956), English Professor of Information Science and Culture at the University of Amsterdam and former curator
 Boast, a shot in the game of squash that hits a sidewall or backwall before hitting the front wall
 "Boast", a track by Collective Soul from the album Blender
 "Boasty", a 2019 song by Wiley, Stefflon Don and Sean Paul featuring Idris Elba

See also
 Coslédaà-Lube-Boast, a commune in south-western France